Death on the Nile is a 1978 British mystery film based on Agatha Christie's 1937 novel of the same name, directed by John Guillermin and adapted by Anthony Shaffer. The film features the Belgian detective Hercule Poirot, played by Peter Ustinov for the first time, plus an all-star supporting cast that includes Maggie Smith, Angela Lansbury, Bette Davis, Mia Farrow, Jane Birkin, David Niven, George Kennedy, and Jack Warden. The film is a follow-up to the 1974 film Murder on the Orient Express.

It takes place in Egypt in 1937, mostly on a period paddle steamer on the Nile. Various famous Ancient Egyptian sights are featured in the film, such as the Great Pyramids, the Sphinx, and temples at Abu Simbel and Karnak, sometimes out of sequence (the boat trip scenes start at Aswan, move downstream to Karnak, and then shift upstream to Abu Simbel).

Death on the Nile won the Academy Award for Best Costume Design at the 51st Academy Awards.

Plot
Wealthy heiress Linnet Ridgeway agrees to hire her friend Jacqueline "Jackie" de Bellefort's unemployed fiancé, Simon Doyle, as her estate manager. Soon after, Linnet and Simon marry after a whirlwind courtship. While honeymooning in Egypt, they are continually stalked and hounded by the jilted Jackie. To evade her, the Doyles pretend to go to the Aswan railway station before backtracking to board a Nile paddle steamer, the S.S. Karnak. Also in Egypt is detective Hercule Poirot, who will slowly learn about the situation.

During an on-shore excursion to the Temple of Karnak, a large stone is pushed off a pillar and narrowly misses the Doyles. The couple is shocked when Jackie joins the cruise, having ignored detective Hercule Poirot's advice to stay away. Jackie also reveals that she carries a small .22 caliber pistol and is a crack shot. That evening, Jackie confronts Simon in a drunken rage and shoots him in the leg, then is escorted away. The next morning, Linnet is found dead from a gunshot wound to the head. The letter "J" written in blood on the wall above her bed implicates Jackie, but she has a solid alibi, as Miss Bowers sedated her with morphia and watched her all night.

Poirot and his friend, Colonel Race, investigate. They discover that numerous passengers had motives to kill Linnet: Louise Bourget, Linnet's maid, was bitter that her mistress refused a promised dowry; Andrew Pennington, Linnet's American trustee, was embezzling from her; Mrs. van Schuyler, an elderly American socialite and a kleptomaniac, wanted Linnet's pearl necklace; van Schuyler's nurse, Miss Bowers, blamed Linnet's father for financially ruining her family; Salome Otterbourne, a romance novelist, was being sued by Linnet for libel; Mrs. Otterbourne's daughter, Rosalie, wanted to protect her mother from financial ruin; Jim Ferguson, an outspoken Communist writer, hated Linnet for her wealth; and Dr. Ludwig Bessner, a Swiss psychiatrist, faced Linnet exposing his unorthodox treatments that harmed some of her friends.

Soon after, the crew pulls a small bundle from the Nile. The missing pistol is wrapped in Mrs. van Schuyler's stole, which has a small bullet hole. There is also a blood-stained handkerchief and a marble ashtray used as a weight. When Linnet's pearl jewelry is missing, Mrs. van Schuyler denies taking them. Soon after, the necklace is found on Linnet's body, causing Poirot to deduce Mrs van Schuyler "returned" them.

While Poirot and Race conduct their investigation, Louise Bourget is found dead, her throat slit with Dr. Bessner's scalpel, and a fragment of a banknote clutched in her hand. Poirot deduces she saw the murderer exiting Linnet's cabin and extorted money for her silence. Salome Otterbourne claims she saw Louise's murderer and is about to tell Poirot and Race when she is shot through an open cabin door with Pennington's revolver, which is too large to have been used on Linnet.

Poirot gathers everyone in the saloon and reveals that Simon killed Linnet, with Jackie as his accomplice and the plot's mastermind. She pretended to shoot Simon, drawing attention to herself and ensuring Simon would be temporarily left alone while she was taken to her cabin. After running to Linnet's cabin and shooting her, Simon, returning to the saloon, shot himself in the leg, using Mrs. van Schuyler's stole as a silencer. He then replaced one of the empty cartridges with a new one, should the gun be found. Wrapping the gun in the stole, along with a marble ashtray and the supposed blood-stained handkerchief, he threw the items out the open window, into the Nile. Jackie later killed Louise, who was blackmailing Simon because she witnessed him enter Linnet's cabin, then killed Mrs. Otterbourne, who saw Jackie exiting Louise's cabin. The plan was that Simon would kill Linnet, inherit her money, and, at a later date, marry his old love.

When Simon claims Poirot has no proof, Poirot claims that the police can do a gunshot residue test known as a "moulage" test on both him and Jacqueline. Realizing they are caught, Jackie confesses and embraces Simon. Poirot suddenly realizes she has reclaimed her pistol, but cannot prevent her from fatally shooting Simon and then herself.

The passengers depart at the next port, and Poirot is congratulated for his work.

Cast

 Peter Ustinov as Hercule Poirot
 Lois Chiles as Linnet Ridgeway-Doyle
 Mia Farrow as Jacqueline de Bellefort
 Simon MacCorkindale as Simon Doyle
 David Niven as Colonel Race
 Bette Davis as Marie Van Schuyler
 Maggie Smith as Miss Bowers
 Angela Lansbury as Salome Otterbourne
 Olivia Hussey as Rosalie Otterbourne
 Jon Finch as James Ferguson
 Jack Warden as Dr. Ludwig Bessner
 Jane Birkin as Louise Bourget
 George Kennedy as Andrew Pennington
 I. S. Johar as Mr. Choudhury
 Harry Andrews as Barnstaple
 Sam Wanamaker as Rockford 
 Celia Imrie as a maid (uncredited)
 Saeed Jaffrey as a servant on the Karnak (uncredited)

Production

Development
EMI Films had scored a huge success in 1974 with a film version of Murder on the Orient Express, and wanted a follow-up. The movie was made during a period of expansion for EMI Films under Michael Deeley and Barry Spikings, who were increasingly aiming at the international market with films like The Deer Hunter and Convoy. Death on the Nile was a more traditionally British film.

The director, John Guillermin, had just made two blockbusters, The Towering Inferno and King Kong.

Casting
Albert Finney played Hercule Poirot in Murder on the Orient Express, but did not wish to undergo the heavy make-up required for Poirot in the Egyptian sun. The producers felt if they could not get Finney they should go in a totally different direction and picked Peter Ustinov. "Poirot is a character part if ever there was one", said producer Goodwin, "and Peter is a top character actor."

An all-star cast was employed. This was Jane Birkin's first British movie in a decade.

Filming
The production spent seven weeks on location in Egypt in late 1977. Four weeks filming were on the steamer Karnak (the historic ship SS Memnon) and the rest at places such as Aswan, Abu Simbel, Luxor, and Cairo. Most of the time the ship was conveyed by smaller boats and the engines turned off, because they were so loud that they disrupted filming. Desert filming required makeup call at 4 a.m. and shooting at 6 a.m. to accommodate a two-hour delay around noon when temperatures hovered near 54 °C (130 °F). Bette Davis wryly commented "In the older days, they'd have built the Nile for you. Nowadays, films have become travelogues and actors stuntmen."

John Guillermin commented that the Egyptian government was supportive of the film because there were so many Agatha Christie fans in the country, and the story "was unpolitical".

During the shoot, troubles arose as no hotel reservations had been made for the crew. They were shifted from hotel to hotel, sometimes on a daily basis. Director Guillermin never was allowed to see the rushes. By order of the producers, footage was sent directly to them in London. A lighter moment occurred during a love scene between Chiles and MacCorkindale, when a hostile desert fly landed on Chiles's teeth. The actors carried on as best they could, but the crew burst out laughing when Guillermin thankfully called "cut" and ordered another take.

Guillermin found the shoot logistically tricky because of the heat and the boat, which sometimes ran aground. But he enjoyed the cast:

"Poirot can be a cold fish, but here we made him more humanistic and warm, interested in young people for instance", said the director. "Peter Ustinov was able to bring that out."
Costume designer Anthony Powell won the Academy Award for Best Costume Design, his second. Among his touches were shoes for Chiles that featured diamond studded heels that came from a millionaire's collection and shoes worn by Davis made from the scales of 26 pythons.

Cinematographer Jack Cardiff says he and Guillermin decided to give the film "an old fashioned 30s look".

The choreography for the tango scene was provided by British dancer Wayne Sleep.

In early 1978 David Niven's daughter was seriously injured in a car accident. Niven would fly from London to Switzerland on weekends during filming to sit by her bedside.

Release

Although it was a British film, Death on the Nile premiered in New York on 29 September 1978 to coincide with the sale of tickets for the Metropolitan Museum of Art's opening on 15 December 1978 of the travelling exhibition The Treasures of Tutankhamun, which had piqued interest in Egyptian artefacts. For the U.S. market, artist Richard Amsel was commissioned to change the original British poster art by including the profile of King Tutankhamun with ceremonial knife (and modern revolver), surrounded by the cast.

In London, there was a Royal Charity Premiere at the ABC Shaftesbury Avenue on 23 October 1978, attended by the Queen, Prince Philip and Earl Mountbatten.

Reception

Box office
The film was expected to be popular with audiences following on the heels of Murder on the Orient Express, the most successful British film up to that point. However, the box-office return was $14.5 million in the United States, lower than the $27.6 million high for Orient Express.

Critical response
The Times''' film critic David Robinson had mixed feelings about the film. Although it was entertaining, and followed the formula of the Murder on the Orient Express film four years earlier, he found it a bit too long and not quite as good. He concluded that screenwriter Anthony Shaffer and director John Guillermin were not quite as suitable to handle Agatha Christie's rich material as Paul Dehn and Sidney Lumet had been when they worked on Murder on the Orient Express.Death on the Nile has received generally positive reviews by film critics more than 30 years later. The film holds an approval rating of 78% on Rotten Tomatoes, based on 18 reviews, with an average rating of 6.6/10.

Awards and nominations

Sequels
A third Poirot film, Evil Under the Sun, was meant for release in 1979, but was released in 1982. It was followed by several TV movies starring Ustinov and another theatrical adaption in 1988 titled Appointment with Death'', which marked Ustinov's final portrayal of Hercule Poirot.

A remake directed by and starring Kenneth Branagh as Poirot was released in February 2022.

References

External links
  
 
 
 
 
 

1978 films
1970s mystery films
1970s historical films
British historical films
British mystery films
British detective films
Films based on Hercule Poirot books
Films directed by John Guillermin
Paramount Pictures films
Films shot at Pinewood Studios
Films with screenplays by Anthony Shaffer
Films scored by Nino Rota
Films that won the Best Costume Design Academy Award
Films set in Egypt
Films set on ships
Films set in 1937
Films shot in Egypt
British epic films
Historical epic films
EMI Films films
Films set in Cairo
Nile in fiction
Films about honeymoon
River adventure films
1970s English-language films
1970s British films